Jordan David Beck (born April 18, 1983) is a former American football linebacker. He played college football at California Polytechnic State University. He was drafted by the Atlanta Falcons in the third round of the 2005 NFL Draft. After leaving the Falcons, Beck signed with the Denver Broncos and was later released after the 2008 preseason.

Early life 
Beck graduated from San Lorenzo Valley High School.

College career
Beck played college football at Cal Poly and won the Buck Buchanan Award in 2004, receiving 35 first-place votes among 257 total balloting points. He was the centerpiece for his team's flex defense and led the Mustangs in tackles in all four seasons he played. 

He set school records for tackles in a game (23 at Montana in 2003), season (135 in 2004) and career (449). At the 80th annual East–West Shrine Game at SBC Park in San Francisco, he recorded a team-high six stops for the West.

Professional career 
Atlanta selected Beck with the 90th overall pick in the 2005 NFL Draft. Following an injury to his left foot while making an interception during the preseason as a rookie, and then playing the 2006 season with the Falcons, he played for the Denver Broncos in 2007.

References

External links
 Atlanta Falcons bio

1983 births
Living people
American football linebackers
Atlanta Falcons players
Cal Poly Mustangs football players
Denver Broncos players
People from Santa Cruz County, California
Players of American football from California